The 2008 European Women Sevens Championship was the sixth edition of the European Women's Sevens Championship.

Emerging (European) Nations 2008 
Date/Venue: 21–24 March 2008, Austria. (Summarised)
Romania and Switzerland had been possible participants but do not appear to have attended..

Pool Stages
POOL A

Serbia 0-25 Czech Republic
Bulgaria 0-25 Finland
Czech Republic 31-0 Luxembourg
Bulgaria 12-10 Serbia
Finland 22-7 Luxembourg
Czech Republic 5-5 Bulgaria
Finland 44-7 Serbia
Bulgaria 10-7 Luxembourg
Czech Republic 0-34 Finland
Luxembourg 12-24 Serbia
POOL B

Bosnia and Herzogovina 0-20 Poland
Croatia 7-14 Austria
Poland 17-5 Hungary
Croatia 26-0 Bosnia and Herzogovina
Austria 21-17 Hungary
Poland 12-19 Croatia
Austria 36-0 Bosnia and Herzogovina
Croatia 22-0 Hungary
Poland 26-7 Austria
Hungary 21-0 Bosnia and Herzogovina

Classification Stages
9th Place
Luxembourg 25-0 Bosnia and Herzogovina
5th to 8th
Bulgaria 17-7 Hungary
Serbia 0-21 Croatia

7th Place
Hungary 0-14 Serbia

5th Place
Bulgaria 0-7 Croatia

1st to 4th
Finland 29-5 Austria
Czech Republic 25-0 Poland

3rd Place
Austria 7-22 Poland

1st Place
Finland 34-0 Czech Republic

World Cup Qualifier 2008 (Europe)
Venue/Date: Bosnia, 10–11 May 2008. (Source FIRA-AER) Summarised

Pool Stages
POOL A

Finland 45-0 Slovenia
Bulgaria 17-0 Serbia
Lithuania 24-7 Latvia
Serbia 27-0 Slovenia
Finland 29-0 Latvia
Lithuania 14-24 Bulgaria
Latvia 41-0 Slovenia
Lithuania 5-0 Serbia
Bulgaria 0-45 Finland
Serbia 0-5 Latvia
Bulgaria 43-0 Slovenia
Lithuania 0-26 Finland
Bulgaria 15-5 Latvia
Finland 36-0 Serbia
Lithuania 46-0 Slovenia
POOL B

Austria 34-10 Georgia
Croatia 7-14 Israel
Romania 43-0 Bosnia and Herzegovina
Israel 42-7 Georgia
Austria 38-5 Bosnia and Herzegovina
Romania 29-0 Croatia
Bosnia and Herzegovina 0-14 Georgia
Romania 22-7 Israel
Croatia 5-12 Austria
Israel 12-0 Bosnia and Herzegovina
Croatia 15-7 Georgia
Romania 17-0 Austria
Croatia 57-0 Bosnia and Herzegovina
Austria 0-5 Israel
Romania 50-0 Georgia

Classification Stages 
Bowl Semi-finals
Serbia 27-0 Bosnia and Herzegovina
Slovenia 0-31 Georgia
Plate Semi-finals
Lithuania 0-22 Croatia
Latvia 5-0 Austria
Cup Semi-finals
Finland 31-0 Israel
Bulgaria 0-43 Romania
11th Place
Bosnia and Herzegovina 10-5 Slovenia
9th Place
Serbia 20-0 Georgia
7th Place
Austria 17-12 Lithuania
5th Place
Croatia 12-17 Latvia
3rd Place
Israel 7-5 Bulgaria
1st Place
Finland 14-21 Romania

Qualifiers
ROMANIA, FINLAND, ISRAEL

World Cup Qualifier 2008 (Europe)
Venue/Date: Belgium, 30 May-1 June 2008. (Source FIRA-AER) (Summarised)
3 teams progressed.

Pool Stages
POOL A

Note - Andorra shown by FIRA as 1st but due to head to head they finished below Moldova

Andorra 41-0 Luxembourg
Norway 7-5 Malta
Switzerland 19-7 Moldova
Malta 50-0 Luxembourg
Andorra 5-17 Moldova
Switzerland 10-14 Norway
Moldova 20-0 Luxembourg
Switzerland 0-10 Malta
Norway 0-10 Andorra
Malta 5-15 Moldova
Norway 26-5 Luxembourg
Switzerland 5-14 Andorra
Norway 0-10 Moldova
Andorra 5-0 Malta
Switzerland 34-5 Luxembourg
POOL B

Czech Republic 36-14 Hungary
 10-14 Poland
Germany 38-0 Denmark
Poland 26-10 Hungary
Czech Republic 31-0 Denmark
Germany 49-0 
Denmark 28-5 Hungary
Germany 51-0 Poland
 17-5 Czech Republic
Poland 27-5 Denmark
Belgium 17-22 Hungary
Germany 38-0 Czech Republic
 14-0 Denmark
Czech Republic 14-5 Poland
Germany 40-5 Hungary

Classification Stages
Bowl Semi-finals
Switzerland 12-10 Hungary
Denmark 19-0 Luxembourg
Plate Semi-finals
Norway 7-10 Belgium
Malta 24-0 Poland
Cup Semi-finals
Moldova 17-5 Czech Republic
Andorra 0-50 Germany
11th Place
Hungary 31-0 Luxembourg
9th Place
Denmark 5-31 Switzerland
7th Place
Poland 10-17 Norway
5th Place
Belgium 5-29 Malta
3rd Place
Andorra 7-0 Czech Republic
1st Place
Germany 43-0 Moldova

QUALIFIERS - GERMANY, MOLDOVA and ANDORRA

Note: Subsequently Czech Republic added as best fourth place over Bulgaria, in place of Scotland

FIRA-AER Tournament 2008 - Top 16 
Venue/Date: Limoges, France on 14 and 15 June 2008. This was the qualifying tournament for the World Cup in 2009 (Source Fira-Aer)
The 10 team format was replaced by 16 teams as it was the World Cup qualifier.  6 teams progressed to Dubai.
Teams confirmed (pre-qualified) were France, England, Spain, Wales, Italy, Netherlands, Sweden, Russia, and Portugal.
3 teams qualified from Bosnia (Romania, Finland and Israel), and 3 from Belgium (Germany, Moldova and Andorra). A fourth team from the Belgium tournament (Czech Republic) also qualified in place of Scotland.

In summary the awards went to:
Cup Winners - England
Also Qualified for Dubai - Netherlands, Spain, Russia, France, Italy
Plate Winners - France
Bowl Winners - Sweden
Shield Winners - Andorra

Pool Stages
POOL A

France 22-0 Portugal
Russia 39-0 Czech Republic
France 71-0 Czech Republic
Russia 20-0 Portugal
Portugal 43-5 Czech Republic
France 10-17 Russia
POOL B

England 31-0 Germany
Sweden 36-7 Andorra
England 56-0 Andorra
Sweden 10-33 Germany
Germany 45-7 Andorra
England 40-0 Sweden

POOL C

Spain 36-5 Romania
Netherlands 52-0 Israel
Spain 50-0 Israel
Netherlands 35-0 Romania
Romania 34-0 Israel
Spain 28-19 Netherlands
POOL D

Wales 40-0 Finland
Italy 34-0 Moldova
Wales 31-10 Moldova
Italy 48-0 Finland
Finland 17-5 Moldova
Wales 5-28 Italy

Classification Stages
Cup and Plate Quarter-finals (winners progress to Dubai)
Russia 20-5 Germany
Italy 0-5 Netherlands
Spain 14-5 Wales
England 29-7 France
Bowl and Shield Quarter-finals
Portugal 17-0 Andorra
Finland 21-0 Israel
Romania 0-12 Moldova
Sweden 34-0 Czech Rep
Shield Semi-final
Czech Republic 14-19 Romania
Andorra 34-0 Israel
Bowl Semi-final
Portugal 19-7 Finland
Sweden 22-5 Moldova
Plate Semi-final (winners progress to Dubai)
France 35-7 Wales
Germany 0-29 Italy
Cup Semi-finals
Russia 12-21 Netherlands
England 10-0 Spain
15th Place
Israel 12-7 Czech Republic
SHIELD FINAL

13th Place
Andorra 10-5 Romania
11th Place
Finland 7-10 Moldova
BOWL FINAL

9th Place
Portugal 7-15 Sweden
7th Place
Germany 0-20 Wales
PLATE FINAL

5th Place
France 14-5 Italy
3rd Place
Spain 5-10 Russia
CUP FINAL

1st Place
Netherlands 0-52 England

T-EN Tournament 2008
Date/Venue: 19 September 2008 at Rauris, Austria. Croatia withdrew to be replaced by Czech Republic and an Austrian club team.

Hungary bt Czech Republic
Austria bt Linz
Hungary bt Linz
Austria bt Czech Republic
Hungary 12-0 Austria

T-EN Tournament 2008
Date/Venue: 19 October 2008 at Slovenia. Croatia withdrew.
Austria 31-0 Slovenia
Hungary 15-12 Austria
Hungary bt Slovenia (who scored their first ever try)
Hungary 19-19 Austria

References

External links
 FIRA-AER Flashinfo N°91 - 07/2008

Rugby Europe Women's Sevens
2008 rugby sevens competitions
Sevens
Sevens